Paul Rosenthal (born 1942) is an American violinist.

Rosenthal has played the violin since the age of three, going on to attend the Juilliard School in New York City and the University of Southern California under acclaimed master Jascha Heifetz.

A resident of Alaska with his wife Linda Rosenthal since 1969, Rosenthal founded the Sitka Summer Music Festival, a chamber music festival held annually in Sitka, Alaska.  Later, he joined the faculty at the University of Alaska, first in Fairbanks and later in Anchorage.

He has recorded on a number of labels, including RCA, Vox, Fidelio, Arabesque, Vanguard and Biddulph.

References

 Artist profile courtesy of Chamber Music International

1942 births
American classical violinists
Male classical violinists
American male violinists
Arabesque Records artists
Juilliard School alumni
Living people
People from Juneau, Alaska
USC Thornton School of Music alumni
University of Alaska Anchorage faculty
University of Alaska Fairbanks faculty
21st-century classical violinists
21st-century American male musicians
21st-century American violinists